Greg Davis is an international lawn bowler from Jersey.

Bowls career
Davis represented Jersey at the 2014 Commonwealth Games.

In 2015 he won the fours gold medal at the Atlantic Bowls Championships. and four years later won a silver medal in the same event at the Atlantic Championships.

Davis has won a British title, winning the fours in 2016 at the British Isles Bowls Championships. In 2020, he was selected for the 2020 World Outdoor Bowls Championship in Australia

In October 2021, he was selected to represent Jersey in the 2022 Commonwealth Games being held in Birmingham. He duly competed in the men's triples and the men's fours at the Games.

References

Jersey bowls players
Living people
1988 births
Bowls players at the 2022 Commonwealth Games